Our First Home is a New Zealand reality television series. The first series premiered on 8 February 2015 and ran SundayTuesday at 7:30 pm. The series is hosted by Goran Paladin. In July 2015 a second series was commissioned.

Contestants

Series 1

Series 2 
Series 2 was screened in February 2016.

Series overview

References

TVNZ 1 original programming
New Zealand reality television series
2015 New Zealand television series debuts